Face to Face is the fourth studio album by the English rock band the Kinks, released in October 1966. The album marked a shift from the hard-driving style of beat music that had catapulted the group to international acclaim in 1964, instead drawing heavily from baroque pop and music hall. It is their first album consisting entirely of Ray Davies compositions, and has also been regarded by critics as one of rock's first concept albums. Davies' blossoming songwriting style became increasingly observational and satirical, commenting on English culture, social class and the music industry.

Despite containing the hit single, "Sunny Afternoon", the album's initial reception was lukewarm in both the UK and United States compared to the Kinks' previous LPs, charting at No. 12 and No. 135, respectively. Face to Face eventually earned retrospective critical acclaim, recognized as a pivotal record of the psychedelic era and an important milestone in the Kinks' evolution. The album was included in Robert Christgau's "Basic Record Library" of 1950s and 1960s recordings, published in Christgau's Record Guide: Rock Albums of the Seventies (1981). The album was included in the book 1001 Albums You Must Hear Before You Die.

Background
Ray Davies suffered a nervous breakdown just prior to the major recording sessions for the album. In contrast to the band's earlier "raunchy" sound, he had started to introduce a new, softer style of writing the previous year with compositions such as "A Well Respected Man" and "Dedicated Follower of Fashion". In July 1966, the single "Sunny Afternoon", also written in that style, reached No. 1 in the UK Singles Chart, and the song's popularity proved to Davies and the Kinks' managers that the group could find success with this style of songwriting. The new album would follow this pattern, as would the group's recorded output for the next five years. The 1966–71 period inaugurated by this album would later be called Davies' and the Kinks' "golden age".

Rock historians have credited the album as arguably one of the first rock/pop concept albums, with the loose common theme of social observation. In the album's original conception Ray Davies attempted to bridge the songs together with sound effects, but he was forced by Pye Records to revert to the more standard album format before the album's release. Some effects remain, such as in "Party Line", "Holiday in Waikiki", "Rainy Day in June" and in songs not included on the final album ("End of the Season", "Big Black Smoke").

Recording and production

"I'll Remember" was the earliest track on the album, having been recorded in October 1965 during sessions for The Kink Kontroversy. Two other songs recorded during the Face to Face sessions – "This Is Where I Belong" and "She's Got Everything" – were eventually released as B-sides to singles released in 1967 and 1968, respectively. Both songs eventually appeared on the 1972 US compilation album The Kink Kronikles. Pete Quaife temporarily quit the band before the June–July 1966 recording sessions; his replacement John Dalton can only be confirmed as playing on the track "Little Miss Queen of Darkness". Contractual issues held up the release of the album for several months after recording was completed; Ray Davies was also in conflict with Pye over the final album cover art, whose psychedelic theme he later felt was inappropriate.

Two songs on Face to Face, although written by Ray Davies, were originally recorded and released by other British bands in the months prior to the release of this album. The Pretty Things had a minor UK hit in July 1966 with "A House in the Country", which peaked at No. 50; their final entry on the UK Singles Chart. Herman's Hermits, meanwhile, took their version of "Dandy" top ten in several countries (including No. 5 in the US and No. 1 in Canada), beginning in September 1966. The Rockin' Vickers also recorded a version of "Dandy" which they released as a single in December 1966 in both the UK and the US. Despite what the sleeve notes say on The Rockin' Vickers The Complete, the song "Little Rosy" was not written by Ray Davies (Music: Herbie Armstrong; Lyrics: Paul Murphy).

Release and reception

The album was released in a particularly tumultuous year for the band, with personnel problems (Pete Quaife was injured; he resigned and later rejoined the band), legal and contractual battles and an ongoing hectic touring schedule. The album was critically well received, but did not sell particularly well at the time of its release (especially in the United States), and was out of print for many years. Reissues since 1998 have included bonus tracks of songs released contemporaneously as singles (most notably "Dead End Street") as well as two unreleased tracks.
 
The album was included in the book 1001 Albums You Must Hear Before You Die.

Unreleased songs
"Mr. Reporter" was recorded in 1969 for Dave Davies' aborted solo album, and was released as a bonus track on the 1998 Castle CD reissue of Face to Face. An earlier version featuring Ray Davies on lead vocals was recorded in February 1966 and was apparently intended for this album or an unissued EP. The scathing track satirizes the pop press, and was probably shelved to prevent offending music journalists who had been crucial to the Kinks' commercial success. This early version was finally officially released in 2014.

Other unreleased songs from the Face to Face sessions reportedly include "Fallen Idol", about the rise and fall of a pop star, "Everybody Wants to Be a Personality", about celebrities, "Lilacs and Daffodils" (also known as "Sir Jasper"), which is reportedly about a schoolteacher (and is the only Kinks track with vocals by Mick Avory) and "A Girl Who Goes to Discotheques". It is unclear whether any of the unreleased tracks will ever be released officially. Dave Davies indicated they were never satisfactorily completed for release, and some were later reworked into different songs such as "Yes Man", another song from these sessions, which was an early version of "Plastic Man". In a 2012 interview, Ray Davies stated that "Lilacs and Daffodils" was "awful."

Track listing
All tracks are written by Ray Davies, except "Party Line" by Ray and Dave Davies. Track lengths per AllMusic.

Side one
"Party Line" 2:35
"Rosy Won't You Please Come Home" 2:34
"Dandy" 2:12
"Too Much on My Mind" 2:28
"Session Man" 2:14
"Rainy Day in June" 3:10
"A House in the Country" 3:03

Side two

"Holiday in Waikiki" 2:52
"Most Exclusive Residence for Sale" 2:48
"Fancy" 2:30
"Little Miss Queen of Darkness" 3:16
"You're Lookin' Fine" 2:46
"Sunny Afternoon" 3:36
"I'll Remember" 2:27

Personnel
According to band researcher Doug Hinman, except where noted:

The Kinks
Ray Davies lead and backing vocals, guitars; musical director, arrangements, illustration
Dave Davies backing vocals, guitars; lead vocal ; arrangements
Pete Quaife bass guitar
Mick Avory drums

Additional musicians
John Dalton bass guitar 
Rasa Davies backing vocal 
Nicky Hopkins piano, harpsichord; melodica 

Additional production
Shel Talmy recorder
Alan MacKenzie engineer engineer
Alan O'Duffy (credited as "Irish") assistant engineer

Note
On 3 June 1966, Quaife was seriously injured in a car accident. In his 1994 autobiography, Ray Davies wrote that while Quaife recuperated from his injuries, the band hired an unidentified session bassist for a marathon session on 6 June 1966. Ray identified six songs recorded during the session: "Rosy Won't You Please Come Home", "Too Much On My Mind", "Session Man", "Rainy Day In June", "You're Looking Fine" and the unreleased "Fallen Idol". Quaife later disputed Ray's account, contending that the six songs were recorded before his accident and that the bass guitar heard closely resembles his playing style. Talmy later said he did not recall hiring a session bassist for a marathon session, adding that the playing style does not resemble that of Herbie Flowers, whom Talmy typically called for session work. Hinman concludes: "No definitive resolution to the confusion is available." According to Hinman, bassist John Dalton's only confirmed contribution to the album is on "Little Miss Queen of Darkness", recorded 21 June 1966.

Charts

See also
British invasion
British rock
Music Hall
Satire
Swinging London

Notes

References

Sources

External links

Face to Face (Adobe Flash) at Radio3Net (streamed copy where licensed)

1966 albums
Albums produced by Shel Talmy
Concept albums
The Kinks albums
Pye Records albums
Reprise Records albums
Sanctuary Records albums
Beat music albums